Edwards Glacier is a glacier draining the east slopes of the Daniels Range between Thompson Spur and Schroeder Spur, in the Usarp Mountains of Victoria Land, Antarctica. This glacier was first mapped by the United States Geological Survey from surveys and U.S. Navy air photos, 1960–63, and was named by the Advisory Committee on Antarctic Names for Lloyd N. Edwards, a United States Antarctic Research Program geologist at McMurdo Station, Hut Point Peninsula, Ross Island, 1967–68. The glacier lies situated on the Pennell Coast, a portion of Antarctica lying between Cape Williams and Cape Adare.

References 

Glaciers of Pennell Coast